Giovanni Gerbi (20 May 1885 – 6 May 1955) was an Italian road racing cyclist.

He was nicknamed the "red devil", due to his red jersey and his "never-say-die" attitude.

In 1905, he won the first Giro di Lombardia. In 1911, he finished third in the Giro d'Italia. He held the world "6 hours" record in 1913 with 208.161 km. Between 1921 and 1925, he did not race. He began racing again in 1926. Failing to get a single result, he retired from racing. In 1932, he took part in the Italian Championships for veterans, which he won. He repeated this performance in 1933.

Gerbi died in Asti in 1955. In 1982, Paolo Conte dedicated a song on his album "Appunti di viaggio" to him: "Diavolo rosso dimentica la strada, vieni qui con noi a bere un'aranciata, contro luce tutto il tempo se ne va..."

References

People from Asti
Italian male cyclists
1885 births
1955 deaths
Cyclists from Piedmont
Sportspeople from the Province of Asti